Iberostomata fombuenensis is an extinct species of bryozoans which existed in what is now Spain during the Katian period. It was named by Andrea Jiménez-Sánchez, Robert L. Anstey and Beatriz Azanka in 2010, and is the only species in the genus Iberostomata.

References

Stenolaemata genera
†Iberostomata
Prehistoric bryozoan genera
Ordovician bryozoans
Fossil taxa described in 2010
Fossils of Spain
Extinct bryozoans